The Kalabari Kingdom, also called Elem Kalabari (Kalabari: New Shipping Port), is the independent traditional state of the Kalabari people, an Ijaw ethnic group, in the Niger River Delta.
It is recognized as a traditional state in what is now Rivers State, Nigeria.

The Kingdom was founded by the great Amachree I, forefather of the Amachree dynasty, which is now headed by the Princewill family.

The Kingdom is ruled and controlled by King Amachree XI (Professor Theophilus Princewill CFR), along with his Council of Chiefs, most of whom are royal princes. Together, they make up the traditional Kalabari ruling house, similar to a monarchy.

People and customs

According to one tradition, the Kalabari people originally came from Calabar (called "Old Calabar" by the Europeans), a site further to the east occupied by Efik people. This may have been a 19th-century invention. The Efik themselves say the name "Calabar" was given to their town by the Europeans.
Other traditions say Kalabari was founded by Ijo settlers from Amafo, on the west bank of the New Calabar River, and that they were joined there by settlers from other communities.

The people occupied a series of islands among the mangrove swamps of the delta, where they engaged in fishing and trading.
They would take the produce of the delta region up the New Calabar and Imo rivers, and exchange them for food and goods of the hinterland.
In the 15th century, the early European traders noted that they alone of the delta people refused to trade on credit.

The people of Elem Kalabari originally worshipped the goddess Owemenakaso (or Awamenakaso, Akaso), the mother of all the deities of the Kalabari clan, even when individual settlements had their own local gods and goddesses.
She opposed war and bloodshed, and the Kalabari later claimed she was the sister of the British goddess Brittana, who ruled the seas. Among their neighbors, because of their "civilized" and generally peaceful behavior the Kalabari were called "Englishmen".

History

A ruler named King Owerri Daba was said to have brought the slave trade to Kalabari and Bonny, and to have founded the houses of Duke Monmouth and Duke Africa.
This happened some time before 1699, since James Barbot records giving presents to Duke Monmouth of Kalabari in that year.
Kalabari became an entrepôt of the Atlantic slave trade, mainly selling slaves purchased from Igboland, further to the north.

Amachree I, who died around 1800, was the founder of the dynasty that bears his name. Most of the major trading houses expanded during his reign.
In the 19th century, the Kalabari Kingdom was in the center of a power struggle in the east of the delta.
Elem Kalabari fought against the Nembe Kingdom to the west, the Kingdom of Bonny to the southeast and Okrika to the northeast.
The main rival was Okrika, which had the potential to block Kalabari's access to the interior.
The Kalabari brought their goods down to Elem Ifoko, at the mouth of the New Calabar river, but refused to go the seven more miles to Bonny for the convenience of the European traders. Trade involved the acquisition of slaves, ivory and palm oil, for which cotten clothing, hardware, guns and gunpowder were given in exchange. Salt, made by evaporation, was an important article of trade in the interior.

In July 1863, the feud with the Nembe people of Brass flared up, with the Nembe the decisive victors.
By December 1865 the Okrika had started ambushing Kalabari trading canoes, and Bonny was threatening to join in since Kalabari was blocking their passage through Kalabari territory. The British consul had to intervene to prevent further hostilities.
When Jubo Jubogha ("Ja-Ja") moved from Bonny in 1869 and established the separate state of Opobo, he became an ally of Kalabari. Bonny now began a more serious push into Kalabari territory to recover from loss of trade to Opobo.
In 1873 a perpetual treaty of peace was signed between Kalabari and Bonny on the same day that a treaty was signed between two rival factions within Kalabari.

Neither of these treaties was observed. In July 1882 the British consul had to intervene again in the struggle with Bonny.
From 1882 to 1884 two factions of the royal family continued to struggle for control.
The Amachree faction succeeded, while the Barboy or Will Braide group moved to the new settlement of Bakana in 1881.

Soon after, the remaining faction, consisting mostly of the Amachree group, also evacuated Elem Kalabari, moving to Abonnema in 1882 and to Buguma in 1884, both further inland. The European traders followed them, now going up the Sombreiro River to Abonnema.  The government of Kalabari had now become a council of powerful chiefs and royal princes headed and overseen by the King.

Rulers

Independent state

Names and dates taken from John Stewart's African States and Rulers (1989).

Protectorate and Nigerian Federation

Rulers after the kingdom became part of the British protectorate, then the independent Federation of Nigeria:

See also
Prince Tonye Princewill

References

History of Nigeria
Nigerian traditional states
Ijaw states